Mogoditshane is a town located in the Kweneng District of Botswana.

Population
Its population was 14,246 at the 2001 census, and 57,637 at the 2011 census.

Gaborone
It is in conurbation to the capital Gaborone, whose agglomeration is now home to 421,907 inhabitants, at the 2011 census.

Local Football Team
The football team is the Mogoditshane Fighters.

See also

List of cities in Botswana

References

Populated places in Botswana
Kweneng District